Hackensack Bus Terminal, also called the Hackensack Bus Transfer, is a regional bus station in downtown Hackensack, New Jersey, owned and operated by New Jersey Transit.
The bus station was built in the 1970s and was extensively renovated in 2007 while starting in 2006. An outdoor central island boarding–disembarking area surrounds an indoor waiting room and ticketing facilities.
 Service from nearby bus stops travels to locations in Bergen, Passaic, Essex and Hudson counties as well as the Port Authority Bus Terminal and George Washington Bridge Bus Station in New York City. In October 2018, the Hackensack Transit Connector, servicing the bus terminal, the city's train stations, and the County Courthouse Complex, was initiated.

Location and vicinity
The bus station is located on River Street one block east of the commercial district on Main Street. Nearby is the New Jersey Naval Museum's USS Ling on the bank of the Hackensack River. Reminders of the original colonial city centered on the First Reformed Dutch Church and the county seat of Bergen County, including the Bergen County Court House, are also in the immediate vicinity. The White Manna, an iconic 1946 diner, and the Bergen Museum of Art & Science are located just north on River Street.

The station is approximately equidistant between two of the three train stations on New Jersey Transit's Pascack Valley Line that serve the city. Transfer to any of them requires a short walk or bus trip. Essex Street Station serves the southern part of the downtown and the Hackensack University Medical Center, while Anderson Street Station serves the northern part including Farleigh Dickenson University. The three transit hubs are part of Hackensack's transit-oriented development plan, and potential transit village initiative, which was granted in February 2016. The proposed Passaic-Bergen Rail Line would terminate to the west at nearby State Street. The New Bridge Landing Station (for a time known as North Hackensack) is located over the city's northern border near the city line of adjoining River Edge.

Routes
Originating, terminating, or stopping at bus station:

FT 1X-Hackensack Bus Transfer to/from Inwood West 204th Street and Nagle Avenue in Manhattan, NY via Fort Lee Road, GWB and Broadway.

Bergen County local routes
Traveling within city limits.

Port Authority Bus Terminal routes

See also
 Bergen BRT

References

External links
NJ Transit route finder 
NJT Bus Routes in Bergen County 
NJT Bus Routes in Hudson County 
NJT Bus Routes in Passaic County 

Hackensack, New Jersey
Transportation buildings and structures in Bergen County, New Jersey
Bus transportation in New Jersey
NJ Transit bus stations
Transit hubs serving New Jersey